Apatetris elymicola is a moth of the family Gelechiidae. It was described by Sakamaki in 2000. It is found in Japan (Hokkaidô).

The wingspan is 10.1–11.4 mm. The forewings are pale grey, irrorated with fuscous, becoming darker towards apex and with two stigmata on the plica, one at the plical half and the other at three-fourths. The hindwings are fuscous.

The larvae feed on Elymus mollis. They mine the leaves of their host plant. Three to five larvae may mine a single leaf blade. Mature
larvae overwinter in the mine. Pupation takes place in a dead leaf.

References

Moths described in 2000
Apatetris
Moths of Japan